Sergei Nikolayevich Shulgin (14 January 1956 – 11 November 2021) was a Russian politician. A member of the Party of Russian Unity and Accord, he served in the State Duma from 1994 to 1995.

References

1956 births
2021 deaths
First convocation members of the State Duma (Russian Federation)
Party of Russian Unity and Accord politicians
People from Minusinsk